VS-25 was an Anti-Submarine Squadron of the U.S. Navy. Originally established as Composite Squadron 25 (VC- 25) on 1 April 1949, it was redesignated Anti-Submarine Squadron (VS-25) on 20 April 1950 and disestablished on 27 September 1968.

Operational history

The squadron was the second to be equipped with the Grumman AF Guardian.

VS-25 was embarked on the  when it was deployed to Korea from 1 December 1951 to 10 June 1952.

From 1961 to 1968, VS-25 and VS-23 were part of Carrier Anti-Submarine Air Group 55 (CVSG-55), assigned to the 

VS-25 was embarked on USS Yorktown for three Vietnam deployments:
23 October 1964 – 16 May 1965
6 January-27 July 1966
28 December 1967 – 5 July 1968

Home port assignments
The squadron was assigned to these home ports:
NAS North Island

Aircraft assignment
TBM-3E Avenger
AF Guardian
S-2 Tracker

See also
 List of inactive United States Navy aircraft squadrons
 History of the United States Navy

References

External links

Sea control squadrons of the United States Navy